Hohentengen is a municipality in the district of Waldshut in Baden-Württemberg in Germany.

Geography

Location 
The village Hohentengen lies on the northern banks of the Rhine, overlooking Switzerland. The right weather conditions allow a view of the Swiss Alpes from the 'Kalten Wangen', a mountain in the district of Stetten. Hohentengen am Hochrhein comprises six districts: Hohentengen, Lienheim, Herdern, Bergöschingen, Günzgen and Stetten.

Neighbouring towns  
Hohentengen borders to Klettgau in the north, the Swiss towns of Wasterkingen and Hüntwangen in the east, Glattfelden and Weiach in the south, which are all part of the Kanton Zürich, as well as Kaiserstuhl, Aargau, Fisibach, and Rümikon, which are part of the Kanton Aargau. In the west, Hohentengen borders to the German town of Küssaberg.

References

Waldshut (district)
Baden
Germany–Switzerland border crossings